Simon Sheppard (1948-2021) was a writer of gay erotica and a sex-advice columnist from San Francisco. He is the author of many books of gay sex writing, including Man on Man: The Best of Simon Sheppard, Sodomy!, Jockboys, Kinkorama: Dispatches From the Front Lines of Perversion, In Deep, and Sex Parties 101. He was also the editor of Homosex: 60 Years of Gay Erotica,  winner of the 2007 Lambda Literary Award for LGBT erotica; the anthology Leathermen; and is the coeditor of the anthologies Rough Stuff and Roughed Up.

Sheppard's work is wide-ranging, often combining history, philosophy, and culture — high and low — with hardcore sex. His first book, Hotter Than Hell and Other Stories, won the Erotic Authors Association Award for Best Collection of the Year, and the title story of In Deep was shortlisted for the Rauxa Prize for Erotic Fiction. His work has also appeared in over 300 anthologies and magazines, including many editions of Best Gay Erotica and The Best American Erotica. He wrote the syndicated column "Sex Talk," and the online columns "Perv" and "Notes of a Cranky Old Fag." The online serial "The Dirty Boys' Club," which he wrote for OutPersonals, was published as a novel in 2012.

He also co-curated and co-hosted, with Carol Queen and Lori Selke, the San Francisco performance series Perverts Put Out! founded by publisher Bill Brent. Sheppard was openly gay and kinky, and was active in the queer artistic, political and AIDS-activist communities. With his husband William, he lived for years in San Francisco, where San Francisco  magazine dubbed him "our erotica king."

Sheppard died on February 12, 2021, aged 72.

Bibliography

References

External links
Official website

American advice columnists
American erotica writers
Gay male erotica
American gay writers
Living people
Lambda Literary Award winners
1948 births